William Granville Hummell (February 19, 1882 – 1962) was an American football coach and university professor. He served as the head football coach at New Mexico State University–then known as the New Mexico College of Agriculture and Mechanic Arts–in 1908, compiling  a record of 4–2, while he was working as an agronomy instructor at the school. He was a 1907 graduate of the University of Illinois at Urbana–Champaign, where he was a member of the class football team.

Hummell later served as a faculty member at a number of locations, including Oxnard High School in Oxnard, California, Fresno State University, Colorado State University, and the University of California, Berkeley.

Head coaching record

References

1882 births
1962 deaths
American football offensive linemen
Illinois Fighting Illini football players
New Mexico State Aggies football coaches
California State University, Fresno faculty
Colorado State University faculty
New Mexico State University faculty
University of California, Berkeley alumni
University of California, Berkeley faculty
People from Ford County, Illinois
Players of American football from Illinois